Ruyi's Royal Love in the Palace (lit. The Legend of Ruyi) is a 2018 Chinese television series based on novel Hou Gong Ru Yi Zhuan by Liu Lianzi. Starring Zhou Xun and Wallace Huo, the series chronicles the relationship between Emperor Qianlong and Empress Nara. It is the sequel to the critically acclaimed drama Empresses in the Palace. It aired on Tencent Video starting 20 August to 15 October 2018; during which it was streamed more than 18,9 billion times. It later went on national broadcast and aired simultaneously on Jiangsu Television and Dragon Television from 25 December 2018.

Despite receiving initial mixed reviews from viewers about the plot and the characters, the series eventually won acclaim for its exquisite props, lavish sets and stellar cast and has a score of 7.5 points on Douban.

Synopsis
The story follows Step Empress Nara and her life during the Qianlong Emperor's reign as his consort until her death.

Originally known as Lady Qingying, the niece of Empress Xiaojing, she is childhood friends with Prince Hongli and initially chosen to be his primary consort. However, when Yongzheng Emperor exposes Empress Xiaojing for making Prince Hongshi a usurper against him, Prince Hongli is forced to rescind his decision, taking Lady Fuca Langhua as his primary consort instead. Lady Qingying is banished from the Imperial Court upon Empress Xiaojing's house arrest. Prince Hongli compromises with Yongzheng Emperor to take Lady Qingying as the former's secondary consort in exchange of also taking Lady Gao Xiyue is taken as his concubine as well. All three women are promoted once Prince Hongli became Qianlong Emperor; Lady Qingying becoming Consort Xian, Lady Fuca becomes Empress and Lady Gao becoming Noble Consort Hui.

Due to her involvement with the Ula-Nara clan and her reputation as Qianlong Emperor's most favored wife and childhood friend, Consort Xian is initially not well received in the Imperial Harem and Imperial Family. Dowager Empress Xi,  initially distrusted Consort Xian but granted her the name "Ruyi". Threatened by Ruyi's favor, Empress Fuca manipulates Noble Consort Hui to set traps and plant accusations against Ruyi while Qianlong Emperor turns the other way out of desire to maintain stability within the Imperial Harem. Ruyi is demoted and sent to the Cold Palace for years, struggling to survive and discovering the truth about her infertility. Ruyi is able to return to the Imperial Harem with the help of her allies and turns Noble Consort Hui against Empress Fuca while also revealing the latter's wrongdoings to Qianlong Emperor.  After nearly drowning, Empress Fuca confesses to Qianlong Emperor and dies after cursing whoever tries to take her position as Empress to die miserably and warns him of Ruyi's true nature. 

It is revealed that Empress Fuca and Noble Consort Hui were both manipulated by Consort Jia, a favored consort from Joseon who wanted to win the love of the Joseon Crown Prince. Ruyi's ascension from Consort to Imperial Noble Consort to Step Empress was made uneasy due to Consort Jia's attempt to curb her favor with scathing rumors and other actions that led to various injuries and deaths to those Ruyi loved. Eventually, Consort Jia loses favor from Qianglong Emperor and she is demoted after her plans were revealed. She confesses her crimes to Ruyi before learning why the Joseon Crown Prince would never love her and dies shortly after. Ruyi and Qianlong Emperor's relationship went into further decline. 

Consort Ling, a former maid turned concubine and look-a-like of Ruyi began rising in power and continues to scheme against Ruyi and several other members of the Imperial Harem. Driven by spite against those who had wronged her and financially pressured by her family, Consort Ling grows in favor due to constantly feeding into Qianlong Emperor's wants over his needs and reputation. Ruyi's differing opinions begin clashing with his expectations and desires, causing her to lose more favor. Ultimately, a confrontation between the, causes Ruyi to cut her hair as a means of symbolically ending their marriage and rescinding her status as Empress, and the act was seen as a major insult against him and Dowager Empress Xi. Qianlong Emperor puts her under house arrest and lets Consort Ling oversee the Imperial Harem as the new de-facto Empress. While under house arrest, Ruyi refuses to be treated for tuberculosis and collects evidence of Consort Ling's crimes, which reveals her involvement in manipulating the previous consorts that schemed against Ruyi, and Consort Ling is slowly poisoned to death as punishment. Despite Qianlong Emperor asking for Ruyi's forgiveness and for her to return to the Imperial Court as Empress once more, she refused to come back or even meet with the other women of the Imperial Harem. She also did not disclose her sickness and dies soon after. 

A small funeral was held for Ruyi by her surviving allies in the Imperial Harem soon after and her death was announced to Qianlong Emperor while he was away on a trip. Realizing that Ruyi never wanted to be involved in the Imperial Harem in the first place and suffered greatly because of him, he orders all records of Ruyi to be destroyed and her death to be written as merely a passing of an untitled clanswoman, which brought controversy throughout China and the Imperial Palace. When Dowager Empress Xi asked about his decision, he justified his act by recounting how Ruyi had cut her hair in defiance and his order was her eternal punishment. Qianlong Emperor designs and dedicated a pavilion to her, spending the rest of his life sitting inside of it and forever haunted by her memory as he grew older. To save their only surviving son from the pressures and tragedies that come from being an emperor, he made Consort Ling's youngest son to be his successor instead and retires soon after.

The series ends with a now-old Qianlong Emperor cutting a piece of his hair and intertwining it with the lock of hair Ruyi cut in front of him years ago and dying peacefully. The ending sequence states that no woman from Ula-Nara ever entered the Imperial Harem again after Ruyi's death.

Cast

Main

Leading Protagonists

Secondary Protagonists

Main Antagonists
{| class="wikitable"
|-
! style="width:14%"|Actor !! style="width:20%"|Character !! style="width:14%"|Residence !! Introduction 
|-
| Tong Yao || Gao Xiyue (高晞月) 
|Xianfu Palace
|Imperial Noble Consort Huixian (慧賢皇貴妃)Mistress Gao (Shu fujin) → Secondary Consort (Ce Fujin) → Noble Consort Hui(慧貴妃) → Imperial Noble Consort Hui(慧皇貴妃) → Imperial Noble Consort Huixian (posthumous)
Formerly the concubine of then-Fourth Prince and eventually promoted as Imperial Noble Consort Hui.

A skilled Pipa player who is proficient in the Chinese Four Arts and a favored consort of Qianlong Emperor during the earlier years of his reign, she is arrogant and defiant as a result of her family's status and talents. Due to the actions of her father, she is well-liked by Qianlong Emperor but hated by Empress Dowager due to Hui's father role in having Empress Dowager's daughter married off against her wishes. As a result, Empress Dowager secretly ordered physicians to poison Imperial Noble Consort Hui. Her hatred towards Ruyi led her to initially trust Empress Fuca and aid her in taking Ruyi her down. However, she is eventually discarded by Empress Fuca after falling into delirium caused by Empress Dowager and learns the truth about her infertility.

On her death bed, she exposed to the Emperor Qianlong what Empress Fuca had done, and gave him scabies via a dirty blanket as a parting gift.
|-
|Dong Jie || Fuca Langhua (富察·琅嬅)   
|Changchun Palace
|The First Empress Xiaoxianchun (孝賢純皇后)Di fujin → The First Empress(元后)
Formerly the first wife of then-Fourth Prince and eventually the Empress Fuca.

Elegant and dignified, she presents herself as a respected and virtuous Empress. However, she is insecure and desires to be the best Empress possible to Qianlong Emperor. This resulted in her holding high expectations for those around her- including her servant and children- and intentionally causing Ruyi and Hui to not be pregnant. Her frugal ways were meant

Eventually, she loses favor and succumbs to illness after falling into water via Consort Jia's actions. Before her death, she warns Qianlong Emperor of Ruyi and curses whoever tries to pursue her status as Empress to die tragically. Despite knowing what Empress Fuca did, Qianlong Emperor tried to save her reputation while she is alive and often criticizes Ruyi by comparing her to the late Empress. Empress Fuca is memorialized throughout his reign; he went as far as disowning his two sons for not mourning hard enough at her funeral.

Empress Fuca's passing not only made way for Ruyi to become Step Empress but inspired her only surviving child Grand Princess Jingse to side with Consort Ling to fulfil her mother's final request of vengeance.   
|-
| Xin Zhilei || Jin Yuyan/Kim Ok-yeon (金玉妍/김옥연)  
|Qixiang Palace
|Imperial Noble Consort Shujia (淑嘉皇貴妃)Lady Jin (Shu fujin) → Noble Lady Jia (嘉貴人) → Concubine Jia (嘉嬪) → Consort Jia (嘉妃) → Noble Consort Jia (嘉貴妃) → Concubine Jia (嘉嬪) → Noble Lady Jia → Noble Consort Jia → Second Class Female Attendant Jin (金答應) → Noble Consort Jia → Commoner → Imperial Noble Consort Shujia (posthumous)
A favored concubine of Qianlong Emperor from Joseon that rose and fell in rank over the years but became known as Consort Jia.

Initially seen as a foreigner who is attentive and favored by Qianlong Emperor for having sons, she is revealed to be manipulative, shrewd, and the mastermind behind Imperial Noble Consort Hui and Empress Fuca's demise. She intentionally earns favor in order to make her next son the successor and win favor and love from the Crown Prince of Joseon. As a result, she instigated many conflicts and caused the deaths of various concubines and their children. Her plans were ultimately revealed and she is demoted to commoner as punishment. To save face, her family revealed that she was actually adopted, explaining why Crown Prince is unable to love her. Ruyi reveals this to Jia, who died of a broken heart as a result.

Her posthumous title of Imperial Noble Consort Shujia; her name is a homophone for "loser" (输家). Her sons were taken out of the line of succession soon after.

|-
|Li Chun || Wei Yanwan (魏嬿婉/衛嬿婉) 
|Yongshou Palace
|'Imperial Noble Consort Lingyi (炩懿皇貴妃)
Palace maid → Palace maid of Consort Chun → Palace Maid of the Royal Garden → Palace Maid of Consort Jia →Palace Maid of the Yangxin Palace→ Second Class Female Attendant Wei (衛答應) → First Class Female Attendant Wei (衛常在) → Noble Lady Ling (炩貴人) → Concubine Ling (炩嬪) → Consort Ling (炩妃) → Second Class Female Attendant Wei → Concubine Ling → Consort Ling → Noble Consort Ling (炩貴妃) → Imperial Noble Consort Ling (炩皇貴妃) → Imperial Noble Consort Lingyi (炩懿皇貴妃, posthumous)

Initially a former maid named Wei Yanwan that was a Ruyi look-a-like who rose in rank and rose to Imperial Noble Consort Ling.

Ambitious and hardworking, she initially didn't want to be involved with the Imperial Harem or its politics but instead establish a life with Ling Yungche. However, due to her desires to rise in rank and manipulation caused by the women in the Imperial Harem for their own agenda and out of suspicion, Wei is mistreated by them and various servants. Angry with her situation and pressured financially by her family, she decided to become a part of the Imperial Harem and was heavily favored by Qianlong Emperor for her skills and talents.. Due to her ability to manipulate people to do her bidding, she became the main cause of the relationship between Ruyi and Qianlong Emperor to become irreparable. Eventually, Consort Ling takes over Ruyi's position and responsibilities to maintain the Imperial Harem as Imperial Noble Consort but fails due to unwavering support from Ruyi's remaining allies. Consort Ling's actions against the Imperial Family are exposed by Ruyi and Qianlong Emperor punishes Consort Ling by demoting.

Despite her end, her youngest son was named heir and became Jiaqing Emperor.
|}

Supporting
the Imperial Harem

Members of the imperial family

Officials

Female servants

Male servants

Others

Production
Crew
The series is directed by Wang Jun, produced by Huang Lan, and written by the author of the original novel Liu Lianzi. It also employed William Chang and Tongxun Chen as their overall style director, Han Zhong as art director and Peng Xuejun as cinematography director.

Development
Wu Xuelan, also known as Liu Lianzi, started to write the original novel in 2011, and changed her work several times to achieve the best version in the next five years.

New Classics Media picked up the series for a 90–episode season (later shortened to 87), with a ¥300 million budget, making it the most expensive television series in China.

Casting
On January 14, 2016, it was announced that Zhou Xun will play the leading role of the Step Empress. The role of the Qianlong Emperor, the male lead, was announced to be portrayed by Wallace Huo on May 27. On August 3, actors Janine Chang, Vivian Wu, Dong Jie, Tong Yao, Jing Chao, Xin Zhilei, Li Chun, Zeng Yixuan and Chen Haoyu were cast in major supporting roles for the drama. Around 5,000 actors competed for roles in the drama.

Filming
Shooting began on 23 August 2016 and took place in various locations including Hengdian World Studios, Beijing, Inner Mongolia, and Hangzhou. The series wrapped up filming on May 5, 2017.

Soundtrack

Reception
The series received mixed responses from viewers.

Many felt underwhelmed by the unaggressive heroine, who was not able to face off the villain consorts even in the second half of the drama, thus making her character design flawed and unconvincing. The drama was also criticized for its anticlimactic story and depressive tone. Critics felt that it was ironic and unbelievable for the protagonist to pursue monogamy in a highly feudalistic context. The slow pacing in the first half of the drama was pointed out, with critics believing that the screenwriters neglected to write with compact story-telling to flesh out the characters.

The series has also received criticism over the age of the leading performers, with viewers saying they made unconvincing teenagers, and criticized the series' producers for not using younger actors to portray the lovestruck teens. Viewers were also divided over the lack of dubbing for Zhou Xun's 15-year-old character, as they felt that her voice was "too raspy" and "mature" for a teenager.

However, there were also praises for the drama. Zhang Hanyue, a writer and critic, said "The show becomes more and more heart-tugging as the story goes deeper." Many viewers agree that Ruyi bears many characteristics of a modern female. Vogue magazine commented that the drama actually recorded "the failure of a high-end girl" because what Ruyi had been pursuing was spiritual connections with her spouse; and such a pursuit represents the taste and ideal of the modern middle class. Critics agree that the drama introduces a new light to and narrative of palace dramas, deviating from the existing patterns of treacherous harem games. The drama won acclaim for its exquisite props, lavish sets, and stellar cast.

 Censorship 
On January 25, 2019 the Beijing Daily'', an official government newspaper, criticized the program for failing to promote socialist values. Four days later, on January 29, the Chinese government cancelled the program and similar programs such as Story of Yanxi Palace. CNN and other media outlets quickly reported on this incident, calling it Chinese censorship.

Ratings

Awards and nominations

International broadcast
On 10 June 2016, Fox Networks Group Asia (FNG) acquired global rights outside mainland China to the series. It was the first epic period drama secured by FNG for markets outside China, and was carried by STAR Chinese Channel (SCC), the flagship Chinese general entertainment channel, starting 20 August 2018 in selected countries, rerun on August 6, 2019, in all countries for return a year.

From 27 November 2018, it aired on Fox Taiwan. From 27 December 2018, it aired on Talentvision Canada. To date it has debuted in 18 countries and regions, including the United States, Canada, Australia, Japan and Philippines.

References

2018 Chinese television series debuts
Television shows based on Chinese novels
Television series set in the Qing dynasty
Chinese historical television series
Television series by New Classics Media
Tencent original programming
Chinese web series
2018 web series debuts
2018 Chinese television series endings
Television shows set in Beijing